Baleine is the French word for whale.

It may refer to

 Philippe de Baleine, French author

Places 
 Baleine, Nova Scotia, community in Nova Scotia
 La Baleine, a commune in Normandy
 La Baleine, Quebec, a locality in Quebec
 Tête-à-la-Baleine, a locality in Quebec

Rivers in Quebec 
 Riviere a la Baleine
 Grande-Baleine River
 Petite Rivière de la Baleine

Ships 
 HMS Baleine, 18th century British frigate
 HMCS Baleine, 20th century Canadian minesweeper